The 2011 United States Women's Curling Championship took place on February 12–19 at the Scheels Arena in Fargo, North Dakota. It was held in conjunction with the 2011 United States Men's Curling Championship. After winning the final over the Allison Pottinger rink, the Patti Lank rink represented the United States at the 2011 World Championships at Esbjerg, Denmark, finishing in 7th place with a 4–5 win–loss record.

Road to the Nationals
Teams qualified for the women's nationals in one of two ways. Two teams automatically qualified as the top two US teams on the Order of Merit list after the Curl Mesabi Cash Spiel is completed. This year, those two teams were the Erika Brown and Allison Pottinger rinks. Teams could also qualify for the women's nationals through a challenge round.

Challenge round
The women's challenge round was held on January 19–23 in Grand Forks, North Dakota. There were eleven teams (excluding the two teams qualified based on Order of Merit) participating in the challenge round for eight spots in the nationals in Fargo. In accordance with the rules set forth in the 2010-2011 USCA rules booklet, the challenge round consisted of a divisional round robin with two divisions. There was also a double knockout provision, where a team must have two losses in their win–loss record in order to be eliminated from qualifying for the nationals. Teams played tiebreakers to narrow down the number of qualifiable teams to the number of qualifier spots available.

The divisional round robin consisted of two divisions (listed by seed in Results section) of 6 and 5, respectively. At the end of play, all teams except the bottom two teams in each division advanced to the nationals. The bottom four teams then played in a single-knockout playoff to decide the winner of the last qualification spot. The double knockout provision applies in that a winless team will not be able to advance to the nationals.

Teams

Results

Division A

Division B

Nationals

Teams

Standings
Through Draw 9

Round robin
All times listed in Central Standard Time.

Draw 1
Saturday, February 12, 4:30 pm

Draw 2
Sunday, February 13, 8:00 am

Draw 3
Sunday, February 13, 4:00 pm

Draw 4
Monday, February 14, 8:00 am

Draw 5
Monday, February 14, 4:00 pm

Draw 6
Tuesday, February 15, 10:00 am

Draw 7
Tuesday, February 15, 7:00 pm

Draw 8
Wednesday, February 16, 12:00 pm

Draw 9
Wednesday, February 16, 8:00 pm

Playoffs

1 vs. 2 game
Thursday, February 17, 8:00 pm

3 vs. 4 game
Thursday, February 17, 8:00 pm

Semifinal
Friday, February 18, 4:00 pm

Championship final
Saturday, February 19, 10:00 am

In the final of the women's championship, Lank opened up the game with a light tap for a deuce, and then stole a point in the second after Pottinger's takeout left one of Lank's stones closer to the button than her stone was. Pottinger drew against four to pick up a single in the third, but Lank drew to the button to score another deuce and take a commanding four-point lead. A failed double takeout by Lank left Pottinger with an easy draw for two, cutting Lank's lead to two points. After the break, Lank scored a big three points after Pottinger's failed takeout attempt gave Lank an easy draw. Lank stole another point from Pottinger when Pottinger's takeout didn't push one of Lank's stones out far enough. After coming up light to only take a single in the eighth end, Pottinger conceded the game, and Lank won the championship.

References

External links
2011 USA Nationals Home Page
Results at CurlingZone.com

United States Women's Curling Championship, 2011
United States Women's Curling Championship, 2011
United States National Curling Championships
United States Women's Curling Championship
Women's curling competitions in the United States
Curling competitions in North Dakota
Women's sports in North Dakota
Sports in Fargo, North Dakota